Chandra Pant is an Indian politician who is the current Member of the Uttarakhand Legislative Assembly from Pithoragarh in the by-election in 2019 as a Bharatiya Janata Party candidate. By-election was held due to death of her husband, Prakash Pant, due to cancer.

References

1968 births
Living people
Bharatiya Janata Party politicians from Uttarakhand
People from Pithoragarh
Uttarakhand MLAs 2017–2022